Nephrite is a variety of the calcium, magnesium, and iron-rich amphibole minerals tremolite or actinolite (aggregates of which also make up one form of asbestos). The chemical formula for nephrite is Ca2(Mg, Fe)5Si8O22(OH)2.  It is one of two different mineral species called jade. The other mineral species known as jade is jadeite, which is a variety of pyroxene. While nephrite jade possesses mainly grays and greens (and occasionally yellows, browns, black or whites), jadeite jade, which is rarer, can also contain blacks, reds, pinks and violets. Nephrite jade is an ornamental stone used in carvings, beads, or cabochon cut gemstones. Nephrite is also the official state mineral of Wyoming.

Nephrite can be found in a translucent white to very light yellow form which is known in China as mutton fat jade, in an opaque white to very light brown or gray which is known as chicken bone jade, as well as in a variety of green colors. Western Canada is the principal source of modern lapidary nephrite. Nephrite jade was used mostly in pre-1800 China as well as in New Zealand, the Pacific Coast and Atlantic Coasts of North America, Neolithic Europe, and southeast Asia.

Name
Accordingly, nephrite jade was once believed to be a cure for kidney stones.

Other names
Tomb jade or grave jade are names given to ancient burial nephrite pieces that have a brown or chalky white texture as a surface treatment.

History

Neolithic and Chalcolithic Europe

A lot of nephrite tools and amulets are known since the Early Neolithic (7th millennium BC) to the Late Chalcolithic (5th millennium BC) on the Balkans (mainly Bulgaria; also in Greece, Serbia, Croatia) from two or more unknown sources — Balkan "nephrite culture." Such tools are found in the Later Neolithic of Poland (from the most probable local source Jordanów), Sardinia (Italy) (unknown source) and Switzerland (Kostov, 2005; 2013). Single or just a few finds of nephrite artifacts are also reported from some other European countries.

Prehistoric and historic China

During Neolithic times, the key known sources of nephrite jade in China for utilitarian and ceremonial jade items were the now depleted deposits in the Ningshao area in the Yangtze River Delta (Liangzhu culture 3400–2250 BC) and in an area of the Liaoning province in Inner Mongolia (Hongshan culture 4700–2200 BC). Jade was used to create many utilitarian and ceremonial objects, ranging from indoor decorative items to jade burial suits. Jade was considered the "imperial gem." From about the earliest Chinese dynasties until present, the jade deposits in most use were from the region of Khotan in the Western Chinese province of Xinjiang (jade deposits from other areas of China, such as Lantian, Shaanxi, were also in great demand). There, white and greenish nephrite jade is found in small quarries and as pebbles and boulders in the rivers flowing from the Kuen-Lun mountain range northward into the Takla-Makan desert area. River jade collection was concentrated in the Yarkand, and the White Jade (Yurungkash) and Black Jade (Karakash) Rivers in Khotan. From the Kingdom of Khotan, on the southern leg of the Silk Road, yearly tribute payments consisting of the most precious white jade were made to the Chinese imperial court and there transformed into  by skilled artisans, as jade was considered more valuable than gold or silver.

Prehistoric Taiwan and Southeast Asia

Carved nephrite jade was the main commodity trade during the historical Maritime Jade Road, an extensive trading network connecting multiple areas in Southeast and East Asia. The nephrite jade was mined in east Taiwan by animist Taiwanese indigenous peoples and processed mostly in the Philippines by animist indigenous Filipinos. Some were also processed in Vietnam, while the peoples of Malaysia, Brunei, Singapore, Thailand, Indonesia, and Cambodia also participated in the massive animist-led nephrite jade trading network, where other commodities were also traded. Participants in the network at the time had a majority animist population. The maritime road is one of the most extensive sea-based trade networks of a single geological material in the prehistoric world. It was in existence for at least 3,000 years, where its peak production was from 2000 BCE to 500 CE, older than the Silk Road in mainland Eurasia. It began to wane during its final centuries from 500 CE until 1000 CE. The entire period of the network was a golden age for the diverse animist societies of the region.

Māori

These are believed to have their own  (prestige), are handed down as valuable heirlooms, and often given as gifts to seal important agreements. It has also been used for a range of tools such as adzes and was used to make nails used in construction, as Māori had no metal before European contact.

Commonly called "greenstone," jade jewellery in Māori designs is widely popular with tourists. Stone is often imported from Canada, China and Siberia, and  runs a pounamu certification scheme to verify the authenticity of New Zealand stone.

References

Bale, Martin T. and Ko, Min-jung. Craft Production and Social Change in Mumun Pottery Period Korea. Asian Perspectives 45(2):159-187, 2006.
Kostov, R. I. 2005. Gemmological significance of the prehistoric Balkan  'nephrite culture'. - Ann. Univ. Mining and Geology, 48, part 1, 91-94.
Kostov, R. I. 2013. Nephrite-yielding prehistoric cultures and nephrite occurrences in Europe. - Hemus, 2, 11-30.

Further reading
Adamo, I., R. Bocchio. 2013. Nephrite jade from Val Malenco, Italy: review and update. – Gems & Gemology, 49, 2, 2-10. 
Beck, R. 1991. Jade in the South Pacific. New Zealand, Australia and New Caledonia. – In: Jade (Ed. Keverne, L.). Van Nostrand Reinhold, New York, 221-258. 
The Bishop Collection. Investigation and Studies in Jade (Ed. Kunz, G. F.). 1906. The Devinne Press, New York, Vol. 1-2, 570 p.
Childs-Johnson, E., G. Fang. 2009. The Chinese Jade Age: Early Chinese Jades in American Museums. Science Press, Beijing, 403 p. (in Chinese and English)
Darwent, J. 1998. The Prehistoric Use of Nephrite on the British Columbia Plateau. No. 25. Simon Fraser University, Department of Archaeology Press, Burnaby, 123 p.
East Asian Jade: Symbol of Excellence. Vol. 1-3. (Ed. Tang, Ch.). 1998. Centre for Chinese Archaeology & Art, The Chinese University of Hong Kong, Hong Kong. 
Feng, X., Y. Zhang, T. Lu, H. Zhang. 2017. Characterization of Mg and Fe contents in nephrite using Raman spectroscopy. – Gems & Gemology, 2, 204-212.
Fischer, H. 1880. Nephrit und Jadeit nach ihren mineralogischen Eigenschafen sowie nach ihrer urgeschichtlichen und ethnographischen Bedeutung. 2 Aufl., E. Scheizerbart’sche Verlaghandlung (E. Koch), Stuttgart, 417 S.
Gil, G., J. D. Barnes, C. Boschi, P. Gunia, G. Szakmány, Z. Bendő, P. Raczyński, B. Péterdi. 2015. Origin of serpentinite-related nephrite from Jordanów and adjacent areas (SW Poland) and its comparison with selected nephrite occurrences. – Geological Quarterly, 59, 3, 457-472.
Hansford, S. H. 1968.  Chinese Carved Jades. Faber and Faber, London, 131+96+8 p.
Harlow, G. E., S. S. Sorensen, V. B. Sisson. 2007. Jade. – In: Geology of Gem Deposits (Ed. Groat, L. A.). Mineralogical Association of Canada, Short Course, 37, 207-254.
Histoire de la ville de Khotan: tirée des annales de la chine et traduite du chinois ; Suivie de Recherches sur la substance minérale appelée par les Chinois PIERRE DE IU, et sur le Jaspe des anciens. Abel Rémusat. Paris. L’imprimerie de doublet. 1820. Downloadable from: 
Hung, H.-C., Y. Iizuka, P. Bellwood, K. D. Nguyen, B. Bellina, P. Silapanth, E. Dizon, R. Santiago, I. Datan, J. Manton. 2007. Ancient jades map 3000 years of prehistoric exchange in Southeast Asia. – Proc. Natl. Acad. Sci. USA, 104, 50, 19745-19750.
Jade (Ed. Keverne, L.). 1991. Van Nostrand Reinhold, New York, Lorenz Books, 376 p.; 1991. Anness Publishing, London. 
Kalkowsky, E. 1906. Geologie des Nephrites im südlichen Ligurien. – Zeitschr. Deutsch. Geol. Ges., 58, 3, 307-378, pl. XVIII. 
Kolesnik, Yu. N. 1966. Nephrites of Sibiria. Nauka, Novosibirsk, 150 p. (in Russian). 
Kostov, R. I., H. Protohristov, Ch. Stoyanov, L. Csedreki, A. Simon, Z. Szikszai, I. Uzonyi, B. Gaydarska, J. Chapman. 2012. Micro-PIXE geochemical fingerprinting of nephrite Neolithic artifacts from Southwest Bulgaria. – Geoarchaeology, 27, 5, 457-469.
Laufer, Berthold, 1912, Jade: A Study in Chinese Archeology & Religion'', Reprint: Dover Publications, New York. 1974.
Luo, Z.,  M. Yang, A. H. Shen. 2015. Origin determination of dolomite-related white nephrite through iterative-binary linear discriminant analysis. – Gems & Gemology, 51, 3, 300-311. Albert Saifer, 
Meyer, A. B. 1888. The nephrite question. – American Anthropologist, 1, 3, 231-242. 
Middleton, A. 2006. Jade – geology and mineralogy. – In: Gems (Ed. O’Donoghue, M.). 2006. Sixth Ed., Butterworth-Heinemann, Elsevier, Amsterdam – Boston – Heidelberg – London, 332-355.
Morin, J. 2016. The Salish nephrite/jade industry: ground stone celt production in British Columbia, Canada. – Lithic Technology, 41, 1, 39-59. 
Nott, S. C. 1936. Chinese Jade throughout the Ages: A Review of its Characteristics, Decoration, Folklore and Symbolism. B.T. Batsford, London, 193 p.
Orchiston, D. W. 1972a. Maori greenstone pendants in the Australian Museum, Sydney. – Records of the Australian Museum, 28, 161-213.
Platonov, A. N., V. N. Belichenko, L. V. Nikol’skaya, E. V. Pol’shin. 1975. On the colour of nephrites. – Konstitutsiya i Svoistv Mineralov [Constitution and Properties of Minerals], 9, 52-58 (in Russian).
Pope-Hennessy, U. 1923. Early Chinese Jade. Benn, London, 149 p., I-LXIV Pl.
Rawson, J. 1975. Chinese Jade Throughout the Ages. London.
Skinner, H. D. 1940. The Maori Hei-Tiki. Coulls Somerville Wilkie Ltd., Dunedin.
So, J., J. D. Douglas. 1998. Understanding and identifying jades from the Hongshan Culture. – In: East Asian Jade: Symbol of Excellence (Ed. Tang, C.). Centre for Chinese Archaeology & Art, Chinese University of Hong Kong, Hong Kong, Vol. 1, 148-163.
Suturin, N. A., P. S. Zamaletdinov. 1984. Nephrites. Nauka, Novosibirsk, 150 p. (in Russian)
Tsydenova, N. V., M. V. Morozov, M. V. Rampilova, Ye. A. Vasilev, O. P. Matveeva, P. B. Konovalov. 2015. Chemical and spectroscopic study of nephrite artifacts from Transbaikalia, Russia: a provenance study. – Quaternary International, 355, 114-125.
Vetlesen, M. 1939. Chinese jade Carvings of the 16th to the 19th century in the collection of Mrs. Georg Vetlesen. New York, 3 vol., 895 p.
Wang, R. 2011. Progress review of the scientific study of Chinese ancient jade. – Archaeometry, 53, 4, 674-692.
Ward, F. 1987. Jade – stone of heaven. – National Geographic, 172, 3, September, 282-315.
Wen, G., Z. Jing. 1996. Mineralogical studies of Chinese archaic jade. – Acta Geologica Taiwanica, 32, 55-83.
Wilkins, C. J., W. Craighead Tennant, B. E. Willianson, C. A. McCammon. 2003. Spectroscopic and related evidence on the coloring and constitution of New Zealand jade. – American Mineralogist, 88, 8-9, 1336-1344. 
Yang, Y. 1996. The Chinese jade culture. – In: Mysteries of Ancient China  (Ed. Rawson, J.). G. Braziller, London and New York, 225-296.
Yin, Z., C. Jiang, M. Santosh, Y. Chen, Yi Bao, Q. Chen. 2014. Nephrite jade from Guangxi Province, China. – Gems & Gemology, 50, 3, 228-235.

External links

Nephrite on Mindat.org

Amphibole group
Symbols of Wyoming
Jade